Boris Enow Takang (born 30 March 2000) is a Cameroonian footballer who currently plays as a midfielder for Maccabi Netanya.

Career statistics

Club
.

Notes

References

2000 births
Living people
Cameroonian footballers
Cameroon youth international footballers
Association football midfielders
FC Porto players
FC Porto B players
RC Lens players
Maccabi Netanya F.C. players
Liga Portugal 2 players
Championnat National 2 players
Israeli Premier League players
Cameroonian expatriate footballers
Expatriate footballers in Portugal
Expatriate footballers in France
Expatriate footballers in Israel
Cameroonian expatriate sportspeople in Portugal
Cameroonian expatriate sportspeople in France
Cameroonian expatriate sportspeople in Israel